The Bishop of Bendigo is the diocesan bishop of the Anglican Diocese of Bendigo, Australia.

List of Bishops of Bendigo
References

External links

 – official site

 
Lists of Anglican bishops and archbishops
Anglican bishops of Bendigo